Drasterius sulcatulus, is a species of click beetle found in India, Nepal, Pakistan, Sri Lanka, UAE and Oman.

It is about 4.2 mm in length. Apex of the posterior angles of pronotum is less sharp and not divergent.

References 

Elmidae
Insects of Sri Lanka
Insects described in 1859